CMOC or CMOC Group Limited, previously known as  China Molybdenum Company  Limited, is the largest molybdenum producer in Mainland China and among the world's largest companies in the field. It is listed on the Hong Kong Stock Exchange and Shanghai Stock Exchange.

In addition, it is also one of the largest tungsten producers in the world, and is the second largest producer of Cobalt and Niobium as well as leading Copper producer worldwide. The company's headquarters are located in Luanchuan County, close to the city of Luoyang City in Henan.  As of 2022, they are ranked 74th in the Fortune China Top 500.

History
The original company was originally founded in 1969 under the name Luoyang Luanchuan Molybdenum, with the Sandaozhuang mine being established the next year. By the early 2000s, Luoyang Luanchuan was researching ways to extract Scheelite from its main molybdenum mine. Together with Ximen Tungsten Co Ltd, it founded a joint venture, Luoyang Yulu Mining Co. Ltd. to process the ore.

In August 2006, the company began planning an initial public offering, and, in preparation for the move, changed its name to China Molybdenum in 2007. On 26 April 2007, the fim was listed on the Hong Kong Stock Exchange. Its stock was closed at HK$10.28, which was 60% greater than the HK$6.8,stipulated by the IPO, making it one of the 2007 additions with the greatest surplus in stock price at the first trading day. Between 2007 and 2010, CMOC also joined the Hang Seng China Enterprise Index.

In 2010, CMOC acquired 55% of the Shangfanggou mine from the Luoyang Mining Group by buying 50% of Xuzhou Huanyu  Molybdenum Co., Ltd and 100% of Luanchuan Huqi Mining Company Limited. The  Hong Kong Stock Exchange sanctioned the group for not publicly disclosing the Huqi acquisition in a timely manner.

Shares were first offered on the Shanghai Stock Exchange in 2012. On September 20, CMOC reported raising 600 million yuan selling shares, significantly less than the 3.65 billion yuan initially planned. The scope of the offering was cut back from initial plans due to intervention from the China Securities Regulatory Commission. However, the stock then performed well, quickly tripling in value.

A fully owned subsidiary, CMOC International, moved its headquarters to Phoenix, Arizona in 2017. The CEO of this international subsidiary, Kalidas Madhavpeddi, left the company in 2018.

In 2017, the Louis Dreyfus Company announced it was selling its metals trading business, LDC Metals, for $466 million to several Chinese companies, including CMOC and AXAM Asset Management. LDC Metals was then renamed IXM. CMOC took full control of IXM in 2019.

In June 2022, the company officially changed its name from China Molybdenum Company Limited to CMOC Group Limited. Later that year, the company was included at 74 on the Fortune China 500 list.

Leadership 
The current chairman of CMOC is Yuan Honglin (袁宏林), having been elected in June 2020. He replaced Li Chaochun (李朝春), who held the position from 2014 to 2020. The two largest shareholders of the company are the Cathay Fortune Group and the Luoyang Mining Group (LMG).

Holdings

China 
In China, the company controls three major mines: the molybdenum-tungsten Sandaozhuang mine, in Luanchuan County, the molybdenum Xinjiang mine in Hami, and the molybdenum-iron Shangfanggou mine, directly adjacent to the Sandaozhuang mine. The Sandaozhuang mine is owned fully by CMOC, while the Shangfanggou mine is a joint venture with 45% equity controlled by Luoyang Mining Group.

Democratic Republic of Congo 
In the Democratic Republic of Congo, the company holds an 80% stake in the Tenke Fungurume Mine. This mine was purchased from Freeport-McMoRan in 2016 for $2.65 billion, supported by at least $1.59 billion in loans from Chinese state-backed banks. The deal was facilitated by BHR Partners, which bought out Lundin Mining's minority stake in the mine for $1.14 billion. The mine holds copper, as well as cobalt for lithium-ion batteries.  In 2022, the Tenke Fungurume mine became the subject of legal wranglings between CMOC and the DRC government over the amount of royalties paid to the mine's minority partner, Congolese state-owned company Gécamines.

Similarly, through its subsidiary KFM Holding Limited, the company also acquired a 95% stake in the Kisanfu mine from Freeport-McMoRan in 2020 for a price of $550 million, which also produces copper and cobalt. In 2021, the group sold 25% of KFM Holdings to Contemporary Amperex Technology for $137.5 million, leaving it with a 71.25% stake in the Kisanfu project.  CMOC announced plans in July 2022 to be investing $1.8 billion into the Kisanfu project.

Australia 
In 2013, the company acquired an 80% stake in the Northparkes copper-gold mine in Australia from Rio Tinto for $820 million.

Brazil 
In 2016, CMOC acquired phosphate and niobium mines in the Brazilian states of Goiás and São Paulo from Anglo American plc, including the Boa Vista mine.

Social and environmental response 
In an attempt to distance itself from the mining sector's historically poor record on environmental issues, CMOC launched a number of social responsibility efforts. In the DRC, projects driven by the Tenke Fungurume Mine include conservation efforts, as well as social development and humanitarian aid campaigns for the communities in the region.  In 2021 the company also announced plans to increase its use of hydro and solar power in the Congo basin.

In Australia, the Northparkes mining project won several awards in recognition for their Kokoda biodiversity offset initiative.

CMOC joined Better Mining and Fair Cobalt Alliance and partnered with Glencore and Eurasian Resources Group to pilot Re|Source, a blockchain solution to cobalt tracing and responsible procurement.

CMOC reported Total  emissions (Direct + Indirect) for 31 December 2020 at 1,030 Kt (+60/+6.2% y-o-y). According to its own figures, CMOC decreased its  intensity in 2021 by 20% compared to 2020.

In August 2021, CMOC received an ESG rating of “A”, up from “BBB”, from MSCI, an investment risk consulting firm, in its annual ESG rating report.

See also
 Jinduicheng Molybdenum
 Tongling Nonferrous Metals

References

External links
CMOC  
CMOC 

Companies listed on the Hong Kong Stock Exchange
Government-owned companies of China
Metal companies of China
Companies based in Henan
Chinese companies established in 1969
H shares
Companies listed on the Shanghai Stock Exchange
1969 establishments in China